Clematis crispa is a species of flowering plant in the buttercup family known by the common name swamp leatherflower. It is found in southeastern United States.

Gallery

References

Taxa named by Carl Linnaeus
crispa